Srednereynovsky is a rural locality (a settlement) in Dzhalindinsky Selsoviet of Skovorodinsky District, Amur Oblast, Russia. The population was 54 in 2018. There are six streets.

Geography 
Srednereynovsky is located 44 km south of Skovorodino (the district's administrative centre) by road. Tayozhny is the nearest rural locality.

References 

Rural localities in Skovorodinsky District